Politico (stylized in all caps), known originally as The Politico, is a German-owned political newspaper company based in Arlington County, Virginia, US, that covers politics and policy in the United States and internationally. It primarily distributes content online but also produces printed newspapers, radio, and podcasts. Its coverage focuses on topics such as the federal government, lobbying and the media.

Founded by American banker Robert Allbritton in 2007, it was acquired by Axel Springer SE, a German publisher in 2021. Axel Springer is Europe's largest newspaper publisher and had previously acquired Insider. Ideologically, its coverage has been described as leaning left of center or "moderate". As a subsidiary of Axel Springer, every employee at Politico is expected to support European integration, NATO, Israel's right to exist, the open society, and free-market ideologies.

History

Origins, style, and growth 
Politico was founded in 2007 to focus on politics with fast-paced Internet reporting in granular detail, comparable to the sports analysis of SportsCenter or ESPN. John F. Harris and Jim VandeHei left The Washington Post to become Politicos editor-in-chief and executive editor, respectively. With the financial backing of Robert L. Allbritton, the pair launched the website on January 23, 2007. Their first hire was Mike Allen, a writer for Time, and Frederick J. Ryan Jr. served as its first president and chief executive officer. Martin Tolchin was another member of the editorial founding team.

From the beginning, journalists covering political campaigns for Politico carried a video camera to each assignment, and they were encouraged to promote their work elsewhere. By 2008, Politico received more than three million unique visits per month.

In September 2008, The New York Times reported that Politico would expand its operations following the 2008 U.S. presidential election, and that "after Election Day, [Politico] will add reporters, editors, Web engineers and other employees; expand circulation of its newspaper edition in Washington; and print more often." Between the 2008 and 2012 elections, Politicos staff more than tripled in size. Notable additions included two political commentators, Michael Kinsley and Joe Scarborough, as opinion writers.

In 2009, the web pages shortened their name from The Politico to more simply Politico. In 2011, Politico began to focus more on long-form journalism and news analysis. This shift in coverage received further support in June 2013 with the hiring of Susan Glasser to oversee "opinion from prominent outside voices" and "long-form storytelling". In September 2014, Glasser was tapped to serve as Politicos new editor, following the resignation of Richard Berke the previous month.

VandeHei was named Politicos new CEO in October 2013. Under his leadership, Politico continued to grow: in 2014 alone, it expanded revenues by 25%. By 2016, Politico had nearly 500 employees worldwide.

Amidst reports of tensions, VandeHei and Allen announced that they would leave Politico after the 2016 presidential election, but left far sooner. Allbritton, then Executive Chairman and owner, was named acting CEO in Vandehei's stead. Several months after their departure, Washingtonian Magazine reported that the relationship ultimately deteriorated during a series of events including VandeHei pushing Allbritton to sell the company, and Allbritton losing faith in VandeHei's abilities as a CEO.

Investment banker Patrick Steel served as CEO between 2017 and 2021. He departed the company in early 2021 after four years.

Goli Sheikholeslami, who had been the CEO of WNYC public radio, was announced as CEO by new owner Axel Springer in January 2022 and tasked with leading operations of both Politico and Politico Europe.

Dafna Linzer, who had been at MSNBC and NBC News, was named as the new executive editor in March 2022.

Politico Playbook 
On June 25, 2007, Mike Allen launched Playbook, a daily early-morning email newsletter. Within a few years, the newsletter had attained a large readership amongst members of the D.C. community. By 2016, over 100,000 people—including "insiders, outsiders, lobbyists and journalists, governors, senators, presidents and would-be presidents"—read Playbook daily. Multiple commentators credit Allen and Playbook with strongly influencing the substance and tone of the rest of the national political news cycle.

Daniel Lippman joined Politico in June 2014, in large part to assist Allen with Playbook. Upon Allen's departure in July 2016 to start Axios, Anna Palmer and Jake Sherman joined Lippman to assume Playbook-writing duties. In March 2017, Politico announced the creation of a second, mid-day edition of Playbook—entitled "Playbook Power Briefing"—written by the same people who authored the morning edition.

In 2017, a weekly sponsorship of Playbook cost between $50,000 and $60,000. After Palmer and Sherman left to found Punchbowl News, Politico announced a new team of Playbook authors in 2021, including Rachael Bade, Ryan Lizza, Tara Palmeri and Eugene Daniels. Mike Debonis, previously of the Washington Post, was hired as editor of Politico Playbook in 2022.

Politico Pro 
Politico Pro, a B2B subscription service, launched in 2010. With roughly 300 reporters at its disposal, Politico Pro provides in-depth coverage of over a dozen major topic areas. The service charges subscribing businesses by licenses and topic area (verticals), with the costs in the high four figures to high six figures depending on the scope of the subscription. Despite the paywall in place, Politico Pro has a 93% subscription renewal rate, and it provides nearly half of Politicos overall revenue. Access to the Politico.com, Politico Playbook, and its other newsletters remained free of charge.

Politico Magazine 

In November 2013, Politico launched Politico Magazine, which is published online and bimonthly in print. In contrast to Politicos focus on "politics and policy scoops" and breaking news, Politico Magazine focuses on "high-impact, magazine-style reporting", such as long-form journalism. The first editor of Politico Magazine was Susan Glasser, who came to the publication from Foreign Policy magazine.

After Glasser was promoted to become Politicos editor, Garrett Graff was named editor of the magazine. He was followed by Blake Hounshell (2016–18), and Stephen Heuser (2019-2022). In September, 2022, Elizabeth Ralph was named editor of POLITICO Magazine, now solely a digital publication.

Protocol 
In February 2020, Robert Allbritton, the then owner of Politico, launched Protocol, an online tech news site focused on the "people, power and politics of tech." The site's focuses on arm how to "arm decision-makers in tech, business and public policy" with important global technology news. It operates as a separate company and with separate business and editorial management than Politico.

State editions 
In September 2013, Politico acquired the online news site Capital New York, which also operated separate departments covering Florida and New Jersey. In April 2015, Politico announced its intention to rebrand the state feeds with the Politico name (Politico Florida, Politico New Jersey, and Politico New York) to expand its coverage of state politics. In September 2018, Politico announced it would launch Politico California Pro.

Global expansion
In September 2014, Politico formed a joint venture with German publisher Axel Springer SE to launch its European edition, based in Brussels. In December 2014, the joint venture announced its acquisition of Development Institute International, a leading French events content provider, and European Voice, a European political newspaper, to be re-launched under the Politico brand. Politico Europe debuted in print on April 23, 2015.

Politico.eu, the publication's Brussels-based European operation, was formally launched in 2015. In early 2016, it had about 50 editorial employees and two dozen business employees. A third-party survey published at the time ranked Politico.eu as most widely read news organization among 249 Brussels "influencers" surveyed, although the same panel found it less influential than The Financial Times, BBC, and The Economist.

Stephen Brown, who was named editor-in-chief of Politico Europe in September 2019, died suddenly of a heart attack on March 18, 2021.

Jamil Anderlini, previously Asia Editor of the Financial Times, was named Editor-in-Chief of Politico Europe in July, 2021.

Focus on investigations 
Under Glasser and successor Carrie Budoff Brown, Politico expanded its focus on investigating Washington policymakers, leading to multiple resignations. A series of stories by Sherman and Palmer in 2015 "helped break open the scandal that forced the resignation of Representative Aaron Schock of Illinois in 2015," according to the New York Times. Reporter Marianne Levine in 2017 "helped bring down Trump’s Labor Secretary pick," Andy Puzder, after breaking the story that Puzder's ex-wife had accused him of spousal abuse, according to Poynter. Puzder withdrew his nomination after the story.

In September 2017, reporters Rachana Pradhan and Dan Diamond authored a "bombshell" investigation of how President Donald Trump's health secretary, Tom Price, was flying on charter jets paid for by taxpayers, according to the Washington Post. Price resigned after the stories.

The "indispensable" stories published by Politico under Budoff Brown in 2017 helped it "get its groove back," according to the Washingtonian's Andrew Beaujon.

Politico reporter Alex Thompson in February 2022 broke the "bombshell report" of how Eric Lander, President Joe Biden's science adviser, had been "demeaning" colleagues in the office, according to Endpoints News. Lander resigned after the story.

Expansion
Politico acquired E&E News in December 2020 to expand its coverage of the energy and environmental sectors. Terms of the deal were not disclosed.

Acquisition by Axel Springer
In October 2021, the large German publishing and media firm Axel Springer SE announced that it had completed the acquisition of Politico for over $1 billion. The closing took place in late October 2021. The new owners said they would add staff, and at some point, put the publication's news content behind a paywall. 

Axel Springer's Chief Executive Mathias Döpfner said that Politico staff would need to adhere to Axel Springer's principles, including support for a united Europe, Israel's right to exist and a free-market economy, and that staff who disagree with the principles "should not work for Axel Springer, very clearly". Axel Springer said that they would not require Politico employees to sign documents in support of a transatlantic alliance or Israel, though this policy is enforced at German newspaper Bild, another Axel Springer subsidiary.

Supreme Court leak
On May 2, 2022, Politico obtained and released a 98-page draft document indicating that the Supreme Court was poised to strike down the landmark Roe v. Wade decision that legalized abortion nationwide, as well as Planned Parenthood v. Casey, in its ruling on Dobbs v. Jackson Women's Health Organization. Chief Justice John Roberts directed the Marshal of the Court to conduct an investigation into the source of the leak. The story became the most-trafficked in the publisher's history, with 11 million views by May 6. Politico'''s first tweet on the report gained more than triple the impressions it normally saw an entire month on Twitter.

Collaboration with Welt on COVID-19 global response criticisms 
In September 2022 Politico published an exposé critical of NGO leadership at the helm of the world-wide COVID-19 pandemic response, written in cooperation with the German newspaper Welt. Criticisms included the interconnectivity of the non-profits with Bill Gates, as well as his personal lack of formal credentials in medicine. Additionally, the article noted the lack of public accountability of the NGO's, their haste to put forward their selected vaccine candidates while public debate was yet unfinished, possible conflicts of interest due to employment of non-profit staff in influential health regulatory bodies, and the massively funded lobbying arm of the consortium.  Further censure was given due to lack of consultation with other well-credentialed international not-for-profit groups, and to governments for allowing themselves to be lobbied and yield leadership.

 Controversies Politico editor Michael Hirsh resigned in November 2016 after publishing the home address of white supremacist Richard B. Spencer on Facebook.

In January 2022, Politico Playbook incorrectly reported that United States Supreme Court justice Sonia Sotomayor had been seen having dinner with leading Democrats, after Sotomayor earlier having claimed that she could not appear in person for oral arguments at the court. It later turned out that Politico had mistaken Chuck Schumer's wife Iris Weinshall for Sotomayor, who had never been at the dinner, and Politico did not verify the report.

 Accusations of antisemitism Politico Magazine published an article in April 2017 purporting to show long-term links among U.S. President Donald Trump, Russian President Vladimir Putin, and the Orthodox Jewish Hasidic dynasty Chabad-Lubavitch. The article was widely condemned, with the head of the Anti-Defamation League, Jonathan Greenblatt, saying that it "evokes age-old myths about Jews".

In March 2019, Politico was again accused of antisemitism when it published an article depicting imagery of presidential candidate U.S. Senator Bernie Sanders next to money trees. Sanders, one of two Jewish candidates for the 2020 U.S. presidential election, was targeted for the amount of wealth he accumulated over his lifetime. Politico staff writer Michael Kruse wrote the article detailing the senator's wealth, writing that Sanders "might still be cheap", according to one of the senator's friends, "but he's sure not poor", which was criticized as combining two antisemitic tropes (Jews are cheap; Jews are rich). Politico official Twitter account used the quote to share the story; the tweet was later deleted.

 Donald Trump 
On January 14, 2021, conservative commentator Ben Shapiro was featured as a guest writer for Politico's Playbook newsletter, where he defended Republicans in the U.S. House of Representatives who opposed the second impeachment of Donald Trump. The newsletter drew backlash from Politico staffers. Matthew Kaminski, editor in chief of Politico, declined to apologize and defended the decision to publish the article, stating: "We're not going to back away from having published something because some people think it was a mistake to do so." He added that the newspaper "stands by every word" in the article. According to The Daily Beast, more than 100 Politico staffers signed onto a letter to publisher Robert Allbritton criticizing Politico's decision to feature Shapiro's article and the response from Kaminski.

Cambridge Analytica, a British political consulting firm, microtargeted pro-Trump voters and anti-Hillary Clinton voters with native advertising and sponsored or branded content on Politico.

 Distribution and content 

As of 2017, Politico claimed to average 26 million unique visitors a month to its American website, and more than 1.5 million unique visitors to its European site.  Following the acquisition of the company by Axel Springer SE, Haaretz and Fairness & Accuracy in Reporting reported that Politico would enforce a policy on employees requiring them to acknowledge Israel's right to exist.

The print newspaper had a circulation of approximately 32,000 in 2009, distributed free in Washington, D.C. and Manhattan. The newspaper prints up to five issues a week while Congress is in session and sometimes publishes one issue a week when Congress is in recess. It carries advertising, including full-page ads from trade associations and a large help-wanted section listing Washington political jobs.

 Influence 
Multiple commentators have credited Politicos original organizational philosophy—namely, prioritizing scoops and publishing large numbers of stories—with forcing other, more-established publications to make a number of changes, such as increasing their pace of production and changing their tone. Other outlets, including Axios and Punchbowl News, were started by Politico employees.

Awards and recognitionPolitico won a Pulitzer Prize in 2012, for Matt Wuerker's editorial cartoons. Politico'' also has won three George Polk Awards, the first in 2014 for Rania Abouzeid's investigation of the rise of the Islamic State, the second in 2019 for Helena Bottemiller Evich's investigation of the Trump administration's efforts to bury its climate change plans, and the third in 2020 for Diamond's investigation of political interference in the U.S. federal government's response to the COVID-19 pandemic.

See also
 List of newspapers in Washington, D.C.

References

External links

 

 
2007 establishments in Virginia
2021 mergers and acquisitions
American political websites
Axel Springer SE
Centrism
Companies based in Arlington County, Virginia
Internet properties established in 2013
Newspapers published in Virginia
Podcasting companies
Privately held companies based in Virginia
Publications established in 2007